In mathematics, a chaotic map is a map (namely, an evolution function) that exhibits some sort of chaotic behavior.  Maps may be parameterized by a discrete-time or a continuous-time parameter. Discrete maps usually take the form of iterated functions.  Chaotic maps often occur in the study of dynamical systems.

Chaotic maps often generate fractals. Although a fractal may be constructed by an iterative procedure, some fractals are studied in and of themselves, as sets rather than in terms of the map that generates them.  This is often because there are several different iterative procedures to generate the same fractal.

List of chaotic maps

List of fractals

 Cantor set
 de Rham curve
 Gravity set, or Mitchell-Green gravity set
 Julia set - derived from complex quadratic map
 Koch snowflake - special case of de Rham curve
 Lyapunov fractal
 Mandelbrot set  - derived from complex quadratic map
 Menger sponge
 Newton fractal
 Nova fractal - derived from Newton fractal
 Quaternionic fractal  - three dimensional complex quadratic map
 Sierpinski carpet
 Sierpinski triangle

References

Chaotic maps